Ivaylo Lyubchev Asparuhov (born 31 March 1971 in Sofia) was a Bulgarian football player, striker and currently coach in the North West Regional Youth team, new project of Bulgarian Football Union.

As a coach Asparuhov presented with their teams attacking, aggressive football. Pointed out is the way in professional football players like Bojan Tabakov, Borislav Baldzhiyski, Simeon Ivanov.

Achievements as a player
2nd top-scorer of Bulgarian L2 with 16 goals: 1996

vice-champion of FYR Macedonia with FK Skopje: 1997

champion of FYR Macedonia with Sloga Jugomagnat: 1998

Winner of Cup of FYR Macedonia: 1998

Top-scorer of First Macedonian League in 1998 with 24 goals

Achievements as a coach
At 2008 Asparuhov appointed as a coach in Levski FC academy. He start to work with U19 team and won National Championship U19 and International tournament Youlian Manzarov.
At 2011 Asparuhov appointed in new project of Bulgarian Football Union for youth players. He take head coach position in North West regional teams for U15 and U16.

References
http://www.sportal.bg/statistics_manager_details.php?champ=3&team=1

External links
 http://gong.bg/view_article.php?article_id=71968
 http://topsport.ibox.bg/news/id_676736806
 http://topsport.ibox.bg/news/id_84550501
 http://topsport.ibox.bg/news/id_2018738160
 http://www.novsport.com/news28252_1003.html

1971 births
Living people
Footballers from Sofia
Bulgarian footballers
FC Lokomotiv 1929 Sofia players
First Professional Football League (Bulgaria) players
Bulgarian expatriate footballers
FK Sloga Jugomagnat players
FK Skopje players
Expatriate footballers in North Macedonia
NK Primorje players
Expatriate footballers in Slovenia
Association football forwards